Amicus is a genus of green algae belonging to the family Dasycladaceae.

Species:

Amicus fortunatus 
Amicus klekensis 
Amicus konishii 
Amicus orientalis

References

Dasycladaceae
Chlorophyta genera